The Gustav Mahler Stube, formerly Trenkenhof, is a farmhouse in Altschluderbach, near Toblach in South Tyrol, Italy. It has a restaurant with a Tyrolean cuisine and two apartments. The Stube furthermore manages an animal park with domestic, wild and exotic animals.

The farmhouse is especially known as the former residence of the Austrian composer Gustav Mahler (1860-1911), who stayed here from 1908 to 1910. The first floor was a museum on his life and work. His composing hut is located in the park and is still equipped as a small museum and memorial.

Gustav Mahler composing hut

History 
Mahler and his wife Alma visited the place for the first time in 1907. They lived here in the summer from 1908 to 1910; after his death, she stayed here in 1911 too. After their daughter Putzi died in 1907 at the Wörthersee, where Mahler had previously had his composing hut, they decided not to return there anymore but to live on the first floor of this farmhouse instead. Aside, the wooden little house near Trenkenhof was prepared for Mahler, so he could compose music there.

In Altschluderbach he composed " Das Lied von der Erde", his ninth and (not completed) tenth symphony.

Museum 

At a distance of five minutes, the little composing hut. Here Gustav Mahler created his 9th, 10th symphony and " Das Lied von der Erde".
At the moment it is under restauration and it will be open for public as a Gustav Mahler nature sound parc In Altschluderbach, Toblach.    
A Gustav Mahler Festival is hold every year to remember Gustav Mahler´s stay in Toblach.  

There are more former composing huts of Mahler that still exist. There is also a composing hut at the Attersee, Upper Austria, and one at the Wörthersee in Carinthia.

Gustav Mahler Nature Sound Parc 
Until 2020 the cabin was included in the Gustav Mahler Wild Park. The new project includes a direct access to the cabin within a Nature Sound Park. Restauration of the cabin started autumn 2021. The cabin was fully restaured in July 2022. For not there is no direct access for visitors. It is private. But there is work in progress to realize a parc for visitors in honour of Gustav Mahler Toblach.

See also 
 List of museums in Italy
 List of music museums

References 

Music museums in Italy
Zoos in Italy
Restaurants in Italy
Museums in South Tyrol
Museums established in 1986
1986 establishments in Italy
Biographical museums in Italy
Gustav Mahler
Italy